Pyroclastics is the third studio album by Birdsongs of the Mesozoic, released on 1992 by Cuneiform Records. It was their final album with founding guitarist Martin Swope.

Track listing

Personnel 
Adapted from Pyroclastics liner notes.

Birdsongs of the Mesozoic
 Ken Field – alto saxophone, soprano saxophone, synthesizer, percussion
 Erik Lindgren – piano, sampler, electronic drums, percussion
 Rick Scott – synthesizer, percussion
 Martin Swope – guitar, percussion
Additional musicians
 Willie Alexander – percussion (4, 7)
 Ken Winokur – percussion (4, 6)

Production and additional personnel
 Birdsongs of the Mesozoic – production
 Stephen Elston – illustrations, design, photography
 Nancy Given – illustrations, design
 Roger Seibel – mastering
 Scott Sternbach – photography
 Bob Winsor – production, mixing, recording

Release history

References

External links 
 

1992 albums
Birdsongs of the Mesozoic albums
Cuneiform Records albums